The Financial Stability Oversight Council (FSOC) is a United States federal government organization, established by Title I of the Dodd–Frank Wall Street Reform and Consumer Protection Act, which was signed into law by President Barack Obama on July 21, 2010. The Office of Financial Research is intended to provide support to the council.

The Dodd-Frank Act provides the Council with broad authorities to identify and monitor excessive risks to the U.S. financial system arising from the distress or failure of large, interconnected bank holding companies or non-bank financial companies, or from risks that could arise outside the financial system; to eliminate expectations that any American financial firm is "too big to fail"; and to respond to emerging threats to U.S. financial stability.

The Act also designates the Secretary of the Treasury as Chairperson. Inherent to the FSOC's role as a consultative council is facilitation of communication among financial regulators. The FSOC has the authority to set aside certain financial regulations published by the Consumer Financial Protection Bureau if those rules would threaten financial stability.

Purpose and duties 
At minimum, it must meet quarterly.

Specifically, there are three purposes assigned to the Council:
 identify the risks to the financial stability of the United States from both financial and non-financial organizations
 promote market discipline, by eliminating expectations that the Government will shield them from losses in the event of failure
 respond to emerging threats to the stability of the US financial system

Activities
On July 26, 2011, the First Annual Financial Stability Oversight Council Report  was issued by the Council fulfilling the Congressional mandate to report on the activities of the Council. The Report  is intended to describe significant financial market and regulatory developments, analyze potential emerging threats, and make certain recommendations. The July 26, 2011 report warned that the United States faces potential losses connected with the European debt crisis.

In September 2014, a group of Republican lawmakers accused U.S. regulators of "disparate treatment" of nonbank financial firms currently considered for tougher oversight. The lawmakers stated that the regulators should conduct the same level of analysis and due diligence for the insurance industry as it has for the asset management industry before formally considering whether to designate another insurance company.

After much anticipation and debate about whether FSOC would and should designate individual asset managers (a nonbank financial firm) as systemically important financial institutions (SIFIs) which would subject them to greater oversight, FSOC announced in August, 2014, that rather than designating individual asset managers as SIFIs, it would focus on examining systemic risk posed by asset managers' products, and activities. As a result of FSOC's announcement the Securities and Exchange Commission is now expected and assumed to take a prudential supervisory role of individual asset managers, in addition to exercising its traditional mandate of investor protection.

Since the inception of FSOC, the Council has designated select financial market utilities (FMUs) as "systemically important." The designation of systemically important subjects the FMU to enhanced regulatory oversight. The three supervisory agencies charged with regulating systemically important FMUs are: the Federal Reserve Board, Securities and Exchange Commission, and Commodity Futures Trading Commission.

Resources 
The Federal Advisory Committee Act, which limits the powers of advisory committees, does not apply to the council. The council has an almost unlimited budget in that the Council may draw on virtually any resource of any department or agency of the federal government. Any employee of the federal government may be detailed to the Council without reimbursement and without interruption or loss of civil service status or privilege. Any member of the Council who is an employee of the federal government serves without additional compensation. In addition, "An employee of the Federal Government detailed to the Council shall report to and be subject to oversight by the Council during the assignment to the Council, and shall be compensated by the department or agency from which the employee was detailed." Additionally, "Any expenses of the Council shall be treated as expenses of, and paid by, the Office of Financial Research".

Authority 
The Council has very broad powers to monitor, investigate and assess any risks to the US financial system. The Council has the authority to collect information from any state or federal financial regulatory agency, and may direct the Office of Financial Research, which supports the work of the Council, "to collect information from bank holding companies and nonbank financial companies". The Council monitors domestic and international regulatory proposals, including insurance and accounting issues, and advises Congress and the Federal Reserve on ways to enhance the integrity, efficiency, competitiveness and stability of the US financial markets. On a regular basis, the Council is required to make a report to Congress describing the state of the U.S. financial system. Each voting member of the Council is required to either affirm that the federal government is taking all reasonable steps to assure financial stability and mitigate systemic risk, or describe additional steps that need to be taken. Under specific circumstances, the Chairman of the Council (who is also the Secretary of the Treasury), with the concurrence of 2/3 voting members, may place nonbank financial companies or domestic subsidiaries of international banks under the supervision of the Federal Reserve if it appears that these companies could pose a threat to the financial stability of the US. The Federal Reserve may promulgate safe harbor regulations to exempt certain types of foreign banks from regulation, with approval of the Council. Under certain circumstances, the Council may provide for more stringent regulation of a financial activity by issuing recommendations to the primary financial regulatory agency, which the primary financial agency is obliged to implement – the Council reports to Congress on the implementation or failure to implement such recommendations.

Financial reporting to the Council 

The Council may require any bank or non-bank financial institution with assets over $50 billion to submit certified reports as to the company's:
 financial condition
 systems in place to monitor and control any risks
 transactions with subsidiaries that are regulated banks
 the extent to which any of the company's activities could have a potential disruptive impact on financial markets or the overall financial stability of the country
The Comptroller General of the United States may audit the Council or anyone working for the Council, and may have access to any information under the control of or used by the Council.

Review 2017
On April 21, 2017, President Donald Trump signed one Executive Order: 13789; and two Presidential memoranda: Orderly Liquidation Authority Review and Financial Stability Oversight Council to review the Council and parts of the Dodd–Frank Wall Street Reform and Consumer Protection Act.

Organization

Voting members
The Financial Stability Oversight Council has ten voting members:
 Secretary of the Treasury (chairs the Council)
 Chairman of the Federal Reserve
 Comptroller of the Currency
 Director of the Consumer Financial Protection Bureau
 Chairman of the U.S. Securities and Exchange Commission
 Chairman of the Federal Deposit Insurance Corporation
 Chairman of the Commodity Futures Trading Commission
 Director of the Federal Housing Finance Agency
 Chairman of the National Credit Union Administration Board
 an independent member (with insurance expertise), appointed by the President

Current voters

Non-voting Members
There are five non-voting members:
 Director of the Office of Financial Research (an independent agency within the Treasury Department and established by the Dodd-Frank Act): Dino Falaschetti
 Director of the Federal Insurance Office (part of the Treasury Department and established in this Act): Steven E. Seitz
 a state insurance commissioner, to be designated by a selection process determined by the state insurance commissioners (2-year term): Maine Superintendent Eric Cioppa delegate to the FSOC.
 a state banking supervisor, to be designated by a selection process determined by the state banking supervisors (2-year term): Charles G. Cooper, Commissioner of the Texas Department of Banking.
 a state securities commissioner (or officer performing like function) to be designated by a selection process determined by such state security commissioners (2-year term): Melanie Senter Lubin, Maryland Securities Commissioner.

See also
Dodd-Frank Wall Street Reform and Consumer Protection Act
Federal Financial Institutions Examination Council
Office of Financial Research
Systemic risk
Title 12 of the Code of Federal Regulations
Volcker Rule
MetLife Inc. v. Financial Stability Oversight Council

References

Further reading
Bylaws
Integrated Implementation Roadmap
Transparency Policy
Frequently Asked Questions
Committee Structure
Who is Too Big to Fail?: GAO’s Assessment of the Financial Stability Oversight Council and the Office of Financial Research: Hearing before the Subcommittee on Oversight and Investigations of the Committee on Financial Services, U.S. House of Representatives, One Hundred Thirteenth Congress, First Session, March 14, 2013

External links
 
 Financial Stability Oversight Council in the Federal Register
 Understanding Derivatives: Markets and Infrastructure Federal Reserve Bank of Chicago Financial Markets Group

Financial regulatory authorities of the United States
Great Recession in the United States
Systemic risk
United States Department of the Treasury
2010 establishments in the United States